The 2009 European Rowing Championships were held in Brest, Belarus, from 18 to 20 September 2009. They were the third European Rowing Championships after the decision was made in May 2006 by the FISA to re-establish them.

Medal summary

Men

Women

Medal table

References

External links
 Results

2009 in rowing
Rowing in Belarus
2009
International sports competitions hosted by Belarus
2009 in Belarusian sport
Sport in Brest, Belarus